Rutherglen Town Hall is a municipal facility on the north side of Main Street in Rutherglen, Scotland. The town hall, which was the headquarters of Rutherglen Burgh Council, is a Category A listed building.

History
The current building was commissioned to replace an earlier town hall, known latterly as "the old jail", which had been completed in 1766. After significant population expansion associated with the growth in the mining industry, civic leaders decided to procure a new town hall although the two structures coexisted almost alongside each other until 1900.

The foundation stone for the new building was laid by with full masonic honours by Sir Archibald Alison on 16 July 1861. It was designed by Charles Wilson in the Scottish baronial style and completed in 1862. The design involved an asymmetrical frontage of five bays facing Main Street; the left hand section of four bays featured four round-headed windows on the ground floor and a large oriel window on the first floor with a gable above; the right hand bay featured a doorway with a gable head and a prominent  four-sided asymmetric clock tower with corner bartizans. On either side of the oriel window carved panels were erected, one with "circa David I 1126" and the other with "circa William I 1189", as reminders of the dates when ancient privileges were awarded to the town. The building was extended to the east by an extra eight bays to the designs of Robert Dalgleish and John Thomson in 1877 and an iron canopy was erected outside the doorway in 1902. Internally, the principal rooms were the council chambers, a courtroom and a public hall.

The town hall was the seat of government of Rutherglen Burgh Council until it was gutted during a conversion to offices in 1967, and became surplus to requirements after the town was absorbed into Glasgow District under the Local Government (Scotland) Act 1973 in May 1975. It was then closed to the public in the 1980s and fell into a state of disrepair. The building was refurbished and extended with the addition of a twin-level glass atrium to the rear at a cost of £12 million (supported by Historic Scotland and the Heritage Lottery Fund for Scotland) in 2004.  It continues to be used as a venue for weddings, theatrical performances and exhibitions, while still providing some local services such as the Licensing and Registration Office.

There are also several Category B structures in close proximity (library, Old Parish Church, statue of Dr Gorman, tenement adjoining the town hall's east wing).

See also
List of Category A listed buildings in South Lanarkshire
List of city and town halls in Scotland 
List of listed buildings in Rutherglen, South Lanarkshire
List of theatres in Scotland

References

External links

Ruthglen
Government buildings completed in 1862
1862 establishments in Scotland
Buildings and structures in Rutherglen
Category A listed buildings in South Lanarkshire
Listed government buildings in Scotland
Scottish baronial architecture
Clock towers in the United Kingdom